Giuseppe Baldo (27 July 1914 – 31 July 2007) was an Italian footballer who played as a midfielder and who competed in the 1936 Summer Olympics.

Career
Born in Piombino Dese, Baldo began his football career with local side Calcio Padova before moving to Rome to play for S.S. Lazio in 1935. Baldo was a member of the Italian Olympic team which won the gold medal in the 1936 Olympic football tournament.

Honours

International 
Italy
Olympic Gold Medal: 1936

References

External links

Profile at Enciclopediadelcalcio.it
profile

1914 births
2007 deaths
Italian footballers
Footballers at the 1936 Summer Olympics
Olympic footballers of Italy
Olympic gold medalists for Italy
Italy international footballers
Olympic medalists in football
Calcio Padova players
S.S. Lazio players
Medalists at the 1936 Summer Olympics
Association football midfielders